MacDonald Taylor may refer to:

 MacDonald Taylor, Sr., US Virgin Islands international player, father
 MacDonald Taylor, Jr., US Virgin Islands international player, son